Marcus Aemilius Scaurus was the son of Marcus Aemilius Scaurus (Praetor 56 BC) and Mucia Tertia, former wife of Pompey the Great. Sextus Pompey was his half brother.

He accompanied Sextus to Asia after the defeat of his fleet in Sicily by Octavian's general Marcus Agrippa. In 35 BC, he betrayed his brother to Marcus Antonius's generals.

After the Battle of Actium he fell into the hands of Octavian but was able to escape death thanks to the intercession of his mother, Mucia.

Marcus Aemilius had a son, Mamercus, who distinguished himself as a poet and orator.

References 

 William Smith and Charles Anthon A New Classical Dictionary of Greek and Roman Biography, Mythology and Geography V2

1st-century BC Romans
Scaurus, Marcus